Sugar Plant is a Japanese dream pop band.  Unlike most rock music, their music is generally very slow, mellow and melodic, in the vein of similar American "slowcore" groups such as Galaxie 500, Bedhead, or Low.

The band consists of vocalist Chinatsu Shoyama and guitarist Shin'ichi Ogawa; the band also usually includes a keyboardist and drummer, these roles being filled by a changing roster of musicians.
Chinatsu and Shin'ichi formed the band in 1993, while they were studying at university.  The band's name comes from a sugar factory in Kawasaki, Kanagawa.

Sugar Plant has released recordings on the Pop Narcotic, Pony Canyon, and World Domination Recordings labels.

Discography
Hiding Place
Cage in the Sun EP
Trance Mellow
After After Hours
Happy
Dryfruit
Headlights
Another Headlights

External links
Sugar Plant official site
Sugar Plant official site (older version)
Sugar Plant page on Discogs.com
Sugar Plant Interview with Alexander Laurence

Japanese indie rock groups
Musical groups established in 1993
Dream pop musical groups